A zenith telescope is a type of telescope that is designed to point straight up at or near the zenith. They are used for precision measurement of star positions, to simplify telescope construction, or both.

A classic zenith telescope, also known as a zenith sector employs a strong altazimuth mount, fitted with levelling screws. Extremely sensitive levels are attached and the telescope has an eyepiece fitted with a micrometer. They are used for the measurement of small differences of zenith distance, and used in the determination of astronomic latitude.

Other types of zenith telescopes include the Monument to the Great Fire of London, which includes a central shaft meant for use as a zenith telescope. High-precision (and fixed building) zenith telescopes were also used until the early 1980s to track Earth's north pole position e.g. Earth's rotation axis position (polar motion). Since then radio astronomical quasar measurements (VLBI) have also measured Earth's rotation axis several orders of magnitude more accurately than optical tracking. 

The NASA Orbital Debris Observatory, which used a 3 m diameter aperture liquid mirror, and the Large Zenith Telescope, which uses a 6 m diameter aperture liquid mirror, are both zenith telescopes, as the use of liquid mirror meant that these telescopes could only point straight up.

See also
 List of astronomical instruments
 List of telescope types
 Zenith camera

References

External links
 Zenith Sector by John Bird

Telescope types